

Numbers 467 to 470 were four examples of a unique seaplane design produced for the flying service of the Imperial German Navy during the First World War. These four aircraft were the subject of an order by the Navy for trainer seaplanes for the base at Putzig, at a time when most trainers were merely obsolete front-line types.

Construction of these unarmed two-seat biplanes took place between October 1916 and March 1917., ahead of a separate order for two more machines of different design that had been assigned lower serial numbers by the Navy (404–405).

Specifications

Notes

References
 
 
 
 

1910s German military trainer aircraft
467
Floatplanes
Single-engined tractor aircraft
Biplanes
Aircraft first flown in 1916